Marcin Zborowski (c. 1495 – 25 February 1565) was a Polish castellan of Kalisz (since 1543), voivod (wojewoda) of Kalisz (since 1550), voivod of Poznań (since 1558) and castellan of Kraków (since 1562). He was one of the leaders of execution movement, co-initiator of the Chicken War (1537) and also supporter of the Reformation. Zborowski participated in the fourth war of the Muscovite-Lithuanian Wars (1512–1522) and in the Battle of Orsha (8 September 1514). Murderer of Dymitr Sanguszko (1554).

See also
Zborowski family

References
 
 

1495 births
1565 deaths
Marcin Zborowski